"ATM Jam" is a song by American rapper Azealia Banks featuring vocals and sole production from fellow American rapper Pharrell Williams. The track was released in 2013, originally serving as the second single from Banks' debut studio album, Broke with Expensive Taste (2014). The track debuted on June 29, 2013 as part of the rapper's set at Glastonbury Festival 2013, with New York radio station Hot 97 premiering the clean, shortened version of the studio recording three days later on July 2. On  2013, the full studio version of "ATM Jam" was officially released for radio airplay on BBC Radio 1. On November 9, 2013, Azealia tweeted that she would be taking "ATM Jam" off the album and that the song was meant to be a "passing chapter" and not a single.

Background
During an interview with BBC Radio 1 DJ Zane Lowe—which was broadcast on July 16, 2013—Banks revealed that "ATM Jam" was originally meant for singer Beyoncé Knowles. Explaining how the track then came to be recorded by herself, Banks commented, "She wanted to rap or something and wanted me to write a song, and I could't come up with anything that I thought would be appropriate for her just because I'm so raunchy, but I wrote the song. I wrote like some verses on it and Pharrell was just like 'you should just keep it'".

Years later in an interview with XXL Magazine, Banks discussed her disappointment with the single and its surrounding release. Banks stated that the track was originally a leftover Pharrell sent to late rapper Mac Miller and that her record label, Polydor Records, pushed for the song's release, despite Banks wanting to release "Miss Amor" as the first single from Broke with Expensive Taste. Banks also expressed her frustration at collaborator Pharrell and his lack of promotion regarding the single and further stated that after "ATM Jam" was released, "everything fell apart", Consequently, Banks later exited her record deal with Polydor.

Critical reception
"ATM Jam" received mixed reviews from critics. In a positive review of the single, Josiah Hughes of Exclaim! complimented Banks' collaboration with Pharrell Williams, stating that the two sounded "remarkably good together." Chris Martins of Spin favorably compared Banks' performance to that of fellow rappers Nicki Minaj and Missy Elliott, noting her "crisp delivery and occasional foray into the English accent."  In addition, Jordan Sargent of the same publication called "ATM Jam" Banks' "best shot at pop relevancy in the States." In a negative review of the single, Fact criticized Pharrell's performance, calling the hook "flaccid" and stating that, "overall, no one sounds that excited to be on the track."

Music video
Banks originally announced that the video for "ATM Jam" was shot in New York City on July 29, 2013 with director Clarence Fuller. However, the video with Fuller was  later scrapped for unknown reasons and re-shot with director Rony Alwin, premiering on October 21, 2013.

Charts

Release history

References

2013 singles
Azealia Banks songs
Pharrell Williams songs
Interscope Records singles
Polydor Records singles
2013 songs
Song recordings produced by Pharrell Williams
Songs written by Pharrell Williams
Songs written by Azealia Banks